Cowhouse Creek is a river in Texas.

The stream rises west of Priddy in Mills County. Cowhouse Creek runs southeast for approximately 90 miles through Mills, Hamilton, and Coryell counties, flowing into Belton Lake north of Nolanville.

See also
List of rivers of Texas

References

USGS Geographic Names Information Service
USGS Hydrologic Unit Map - State of Texas (1974)

Rivers of Texas